Santiago del Monte is one of eight parishes (administrative divisions) in Castrillón, a municipality within the province and autonomous community of Asturias, in northern Spain. 

The parish has a population of 209 (INE 2004).

References

Parishes in Castrillón